RCU may refer to:

Science and technology
 Read-copy-update, a computer operating system synchronization mechanism
 Remote concentrator unit in telephony
 Organocopper complexes (RCu), in reactions of organocopper reagents

Organizations
 Radio Club Uruguayo
 Rogue Credit Union, a federal credit union in Medford, Oregon
 Royal College Union, the alumni association of Royal College Colombo, Sri Lanka
 Regional Cadet Units of the Australian Army Cadets
 Regional Coordinating Unit in the Northwest Pacific Action Plan
 Regional Crime Unit of the Hong Kong Police Force

Other uses
 Rocket City United, an American soccer team
 RC Unterföhring, a German rugby union club
 Las Higueras Airport (IATA code), Argentina
 A remote control unit